Praeclara may refer to:

Biology
Bridouxia praeclara, a gastropod species in the family Thiaridae
Platanthera praeclara, a plant native to North America
Praeclara underwing or Catocala praeclara, a moth of North America

Religion
Praeclara gratulationis publicae, an encyclical letter of Leo XIII
In praeclara summorum, an encyclical of Pope Benedict XV